Bottarga is a delicacy of salted, cured fish roe pouch, typically of the grey mullet or the bluefin tuna. The best-known version is produced around the Mediterranean; similar foods are the Japanese  and Taiwanese , which is softer, and Korean , from mullet or freshwater drum. It has many names and is prepared in various ways.

Names and etymology
The English name, bottarga, was borrowed from Italian.

In an Italian manuscript that "closely parallels" Platina's cookbook and dated to shortly after its publication,  is attested in the corresponding passage.

The first mention of the Greek form occurs in the 11th century, in the writings of Simeon Seth, who denounced the food as something to be "avoided totally", although a similar phrase may have been in use since antiquity in the same denotation.

The modern Greek name comes from the Byzantine Greek, substituting the modern word  for the ancient word .

History

Bottarga production is first documented in the Nile Delta in the 10th century BCE.

In the 15th century, Martino da Como describes the production of bottarga by salting then smoking to dry it.

Preparation
Bottarga is made chiefly from the roe pouch of grey mullet. Sometimes it is prepared from Atlantic bluefin tuna (bottarga di tonno rosso) or yellowfin tuna. It is massaged by hand to eliminate air pockets, then dried and cured in sea salt for a few weeks. The result is a hard, dry slab. Formerly, it was generally coated in beeswax to preserve it, as it still is in Greece and Egypt. The curing time may vary depending on the producer and the desired texture as well as the preference of the consumers, which varies by country.

Bottarga usually is sliced thinly or grated when it is served.

Regions

Croatia
In Croatia, the delicacy is known as butarga or butarda. It is usually fried before serving.

Tunisia

Orange and molded in wax or vacuum sealed, Tunisian bottarga is made from mullet eggs and is known as a sought-after product. Initially a feature of the Judeo-Tunisian cuisine, it was introduced in Tunisia by Jews from Constantinople during Ottoman rule, as early as the 16th century.

Egypt

Bottarga is produced in the Port Said area. It is commonly pronounced Batarekh all over Egypt.

France
The usual French name is boutargue. In Provence, it is called poutargue and is produced in the city of Martigues.

Greece
In Greece, it is called avgotaraxo or avgotaracho and is produced primarily from the flathead mullet caught in Greek lagoons. The whole mature ovaries are removed from the fish, washed with water, salted with natural sea salt, dried under the sun, and sealed in melted beeswax.

Avgotaracho Messolonghiou, made from fish caught in the Messolonghi-Etoliko Lagoons, is a European and Greek protected designation of origin, one of the few seafood products with a PDO.

Italy

In Italy, it is made from bluefin tuna in Sicily, and from flathead mullet in Sardinia, where it is called Sardinian  butàriga.

Its culinary properties may be compared to those of dry anchovies, although it is much more expensive. Often, it is served with olive oil or lemon juice as an appetizer accompanied by bread or crostini. It is also used in pasta dishes.

Bottarga is categorized as a traditional food product (prodotto agroalimentare tradizionale).

Mauritania
Bottarga is produced in Mauritania and Senegal.

Turkey
In Turkey, bottarga is made from grey mullet roe. It is listed in the Ark of Taste. It is produced in Dalyan, on the southwestern coast of Turkey, from the mature fish migrating from Lake Köyceğiz.

Spain
Bottarga in Spain is produced and consumed mainly in the country's southeastern region, in the Autonomous Community of Murcia and the province of Alicante. It is usually made from a variety of roes including, among others, grey mullet, tuna, bonito, or even black drum or common ling (the latter two somewhat cheaper and less valued). Much of its production is centered around the town of San Pedro del Pinatar, to the shores of the Mar Menor, where there are also salt ponds.

United States

There are several producers in Florida. The Manatee county tourist bureau states that the process of making bottarga was depicted in Ancient Egyptian murals and that documentation from the 1500s exists that the Native Americans along the western coast of Florida were consuming dried mullet roe when encountered by European explorers.

Elsewhere

There are various small producers elsewhere. For example, bottarga from Atlantic cod (Gadus morhua) is produced in northern Norway, where it is air-dried.

Notes

Italian cuisine
Mediterranean cuisine
Arab cuisine
Byzantine cuisine
French cuisine
Spanish cuisine
Greek cuisine
Croatian cuisine
Senegalese cuisine
Turkish cuisine
Appetizers
Cuisine of Sardinia
Roe dishes